Stina Hofgård Nilsen (born 24 September 1979) is a Norwegian former alpine skier.

Career
During her career she has achieved 3 results among the top 3 (1 victory) in the World Cup. She competed at the Winter Olympics in Salt Lake City in 2002.

World Cup results
Top 3

References

External links
 
 

1979 births
Living people
Alpine skiers at the 2002 Winter Olympics
Norwegian female alpine skiers
Olympic alpine skiers of Norway
Sportspeople from Bergen